Fatherland – All Russia (Otečestvo – Vsä Rossija, OVR) was a political bloc that existed in Russia from 1998 to 2002.

It was formed from the movement Fatherland, chaired by the Mayor of Moscow, Yuri Luzhkov, and the movement All Russia, chaired by regional Presidents of the Republics of Tatarstan, Mintimer Shaimiev, of Bashkortostan, Murtaza Rakhimov, of Ingushetia, Ruslan Aushev, and the Governor of St. Petersburg, Vladimir Yakovlev. In his founding Congress, that took place on 28 August 1999, their first chairman elected were Yevgeny Primakov and Yury Luzhkov.

The party took part in the 1999 State Duma election, being led by Yevgeny Primakov, Yury Luzhkov and Vladimir Yakovlev. During the pre-election debates, the block suffered from 'black public relations' campaign in Boris Berezovsky-controlled media and competition with the rival conservative Unity Party of Russia. 'Fatherland' supported the election of Vladimir Putin as President of Russia in 2000.

On 1 December 2001, a joint congress of Fatherland-All Russia and its rival party Unity decided to merge the two parties into a single new political party, United Russia. In its IV Congress, on 9 April 2002, Fatherland – All Russia was disbanded.

Electoral results

Presidential

State Duma

References

External links
Fatherland-All Russia Official Website (Archived)

1998 establishments in Russia
2002 disestablishments in Russia
Centrist parties in Russia
Defunct political parties in Russia
History of Russia (1991–present)
Political parties disestablished in 2002
Political parties established in 1998
United Russia